The Council of Cabinet Ministers is the body of high-ranking Brunei officials, consisting of the top leaders of the executive branch of Brunei government. Led by the Sultan himself, who has also been the Prime Minister of Brunei since 1984.

The Council consists of the Prime Minister (the Sultan), the Senior Minister (the Crown Prince), ministers and the second ministers, and deputy ministers of respectives ministries. All of the ministers and deputy ministers are appointed by the Prime Minister-Sultan. The ministers are responsible directly to the Sultan and hold their seats at His Majesty's pleasure, usually reshuffle and nominate every 5 years.

History 

The cabinet was established in 1959. Immediately upon Brunei's independence on 1 January 1984, the following portfolios were introduced as the first cabinet line-up:

 Prime Minister
 Minister of Communications
 Minister of Culture, Youth and Sports
 Minister of Defence
 Minister of Development
 Minister of Education
 Minister of Finance
 Minister of Foreign Affairs
 Minister of Home Affairs
 Minister of Law
 Deputy Minister of Finance

On 20 October 1986, after the demise of the late Sultan Omar Ali Saifuddien III, the cabinet was reshuffled which saw the introduction of new ministerial posts, namely the Ministers of Health and Religious Affairs, and Special Adviser in the Prime Minister's Office. The reshuffle saw the cabinet being enlarged to a total of 13 ministerial and 8 deputy ministerial posts.

The cabinet was reshuffled again in 1988, 2005, 2010, 2015, 2018, and 2022. Since 2005, cabinet reshuffle typically happened every five years. However, the 2015 cabinet term lasted less than five years with a "surprise" reshuffle in 2018, with no official reason given, although it was speculated that corruption could be a reason. In contrast to the previous cabinets which served or intended to serve for five years, the 2022 cabinet shall serve for a four-year term.

The State Mufti and Attorney General were included in the cabinet and declared ministry-level positions in the reshuffles of 2005, 2010, 2015, and 2018.

The 2005 cabinet line-up saw the introduction of new ministerial posts, namely Senior Minister in the Prime Minister's Office, Minister of Energy in the Prime Minister's Office, Second Minister of Finance, and Second Minister of Foreign Affairs. Meanwhile, the 2018 cabinet line-up saw the introduction of the new Second Minister of Defence, but the position was not renewed in 2022 reshuffle.

The 2010 reshuffle saw the appointment of Adina Othman as the first female deputy minister, holding the Deputy Minister of Culture, Youth and Sports portfolio. Meanwhile, the 2022 reshuffle saw the appointment of Romaizah Mohd Salleh as the first female minister, holding the Minister of Education portfolio.

Current members
Since 7 June 2022 (reshuffle after 4 years since October 2018), the Council consists of the following:

See also 
Government of Brunei

References

External links
Councils of State official website (Malay)

Government of Brunei
Brunei